Theresa Stoll (born 21 November 1995) is a German judoka. She is the 2017 European silver medalist in the 57 kg division.

In 2020, she won one of the bronze medals in the women's 57 kg event at the 2020 European Judo Championships held in Prague, Czech Republic.

In 2021, she competed in the women's 57 kg event at the 2021 Judo World Masters held in Doha, Qatar. She also represented Germany at the 2020 Summer Olympics in Tokyo, Japan. She won one of the bronze medals in the mixed team event.

References

External links
 
 

1995 births
German female judoka
Living people
Judoka at the 2020 Summer Olympics
Olympic judoka of Germany
Medalists at the 2020 Summer Olympics
Olympic medalists in judo
Olympic bronze medalists for Germany
21st-century German women